Charles Murray Shand Gardner DFC OBE (7 October 1913 – 2 July 2001) was a South African cricketer and Royal Air Force officer.

Life and career
Murray Gardner was born in Grahamstown and educated there at St Andrew's College and Rhodes University. He played 10 matches of first-class cricket for Eastern Province and Border between 1931 and 1937. An opening batsman, his highest score was 51 for Eastern Province against Border in the Currie Cup in 1931–32.

He joined the Royal Air Force in 1940 and served throughout the war, ending as a lieutenant colonel. He was awarded the DFC in 1941 and appointed OBE in 1945 for services to the allied air forces.

References

External links

Murray Gardner at CricketArchive

1913 births
2001 deaths
South African cricketers
Border cricketers
Eastern Province cricketers
Rhodes University alumni
South African military personnel of World War II
Recipients of the Distinguished Flying Cross (United Kingdom)
South African Members of the Order of the British Empire
People from Makana Local Municipality